KSLO-FM 105.3 is a soft oldies radio station licensed to Simmesport, Louisiana, serving the fringe area between the Lafayette, Alexandria, and Baton Rouge, Louisiana radio markets. KSLO-FM is owned by Delta Media Corporation  along with KLWB, KLWB-FM, KXKW-LD, and KXKW-LP.
    KSLO's studios are located on Evangeline Thruway in Carencro, and its transmitter is located in Avoyelles Parish, Louisiana (south of Plaucheville).  KSLO's audio feed was simulcast on KBCA's fourth subchannel in Alexandria until late 2019.

On March 7, 2022, KSLO-FM changed their format from Regional Mexican to soft oldies, branded as "105.3 MeTV FM".

Previous logo

References

External links

Radio stations in Louisiana
Radio stations established in 2008
2008 establishments in Louisiana
Oldies radio stations in the United States